María de Lourdes Viana Posadas (born 10 February 1990), known as Lourdes Viana, is a Uruguayan footballer who plays as a forward for Peñarol and the Uruguay women's national team.

International career
Silvera capped for Uruguay during the 2014 Copa América Femenina.

International goals
Scores and results list Uruguay's goal tally first

References 

1990 births
Living people
Uruguayan women's footballers
Women's association football forwards
Women's association football midfielders
Peñarol players
Uruguay women's international footballers